The Roman Catholic Church in Zambia is composed of two ecclesiastical provinces and 9 suffragan dioceses.

List of dioceses

Episcopal Conference of Zambia

Ecclesiastical Province of Kasama
Archdiocese of Kasama
Diocese of Mansa
Diocese of Mpika

Ecclesiastical Province of Lusaka
Archdiocese of Lusaka
Diocese of Chipata
Diocese of Kabwe
Diocese of Livingstone
Diocese of Mongu
Diocese of Monze
Diocese of Ndola
Diocese of Solwezi

External links 
Catholic-Hierarchy entry.
GCatholic.org.

Zambia
Catholic dioceses